Victor Adolphus Pépin (March 8, 1780 – 1845) was an American circus performer and circus owner most famous for being a partner in the Circus of Pépin and Breschard.  The Circus of Pépin and Breschard can thus be considered the first American circus and Pépin the first American circus impresario.

Biography
Victor Adolphus Pépin, the eldest son of André Pepin, a Canadian who fought for the Americans in their Revolution against the British, was born in Albany, New York.

Victor was taken by his father to France in 1793 and returned to the United States with Jean Breschard in 1807.

Pépin was the probable cause of a riot centered on his circus in Pittsburgh in 1824.

In 1833, he was a member of John Charles Beales's Rio Grande Colony which helped colonize Texas.

Victor Pépin was a participant in the circus business from at least 1805 until 1831.  He died in 1845 and is buried at New Albany, Indiana in an unmarked grave at Fairview Cemetery.

External links
The Circus in America: 1793-1940
Olympians of the Sawdust Circle
Charles Beales's Rio Grande Colony By Eduard Ludecus, Louis E. Brister
Olympians of the Sawdust Circle by William L. Slout

References

American circus performers
American male equestrians
1780 births
1845 deaths
Businesspeople from Albany, New York
Circus owners
American expatriates in France
19th-century American businesspeople